The following is a list of all suspensions and fines enforced in the National Hockey League (NHL) during the 2014–15 NHL season. It lists which players or coaches of what team have been punished for which offense and the amount of punishment they have received.

Based on each player's average annual salary, divided by number of days in the season (195) for non-repeat offenders and games (82) for repeat offenders, salary will be forfeited for the term of their suspension. Players' money forfeited due to suspension or fine goes to the Players' Emergency Assistance Fund, while money forfeited by coaches, staff or organizations as a whole go to the NHL Foundation.

Suspensions
‡ - suspension covered at least one 2015 playoff game

 All figures are in US dollars
 Suspension will be served at the beginning of any new contract. The suspension is accompanied by mandatory referral to the NHL/NHLPA Program for Substance Abuse and Behavioral Health.
 Voynov had played in six games for the Kings before his suspension and was not reinstated before the end of the season. On May 30, 2016, the NHL ruled Voynov's suspension was still in effect and he was not eligible to play in the 2016 World Cup of Hockey. On April 9, 2019, the NHL lifted Voynov's indefinite suspension, instead suspended him for the entirety of the 2019–20 NHL season and playoffs, leaving Voynov eligible to return to play in the NHL (barring further incident) on July 1, 2020. After appeal by Voynov and the NHLPA, on May 23, 2019, NHL/NHLPA Neutral Discipline Arbitrator, Shyam Das, upheld the suspension, but credited Voynov with having already served 41 games of such suspension, thus making him eligible to return at the mid-point of the 2019-20 regular season.
 Voynov was suspended with pay and did not forfeit any salary.
 Suspension accompanied by mandatory referral to the NHL/NHLPA Program for Substance Abuse and Behavioral Health.

Fines
Players can be fined up to 50% of one day's salary, up to a maximum of $10,000.00 for their first offense, and $15,000.00 for any subsequent offenses. Fines listed in italics indicate that was the maximum allowed fine.

 All figures are in US dollars

Further reading

See also 
 2014 in sports
 2015 in sports
 2014 NHL Entry Draft
 2014–15 NHL season
 2014–15 NHL transactions
 2014–15 NHL Three Star Awards
 2013–14 NHL suspensions and fines

References

Suspension And Fines
National Hockey League suspensions and fines